The Lau Basin is a back-arc basin (also addressed as "interarc basin") at the Australian-Pacific plate boundary. It is formed by the Pacific plate subducting under the Australian plate. The Tonga-Kermadec Ridge, a frontal arc, and the Lau-Colville Ridge, a remnant arc, sit to the eastern and western sides of the basin, respectively.

History
Lau Basin is a young basin (<= 5 m.y. old) that separates a previously continuous island arc by extensional rifting.
During the Pliocene, the Pacific plate was subducting beneath the Australian plate. The slab of the Pacific plate melted as it was thrust down, and then rose to form the original Tonga-Kermadec Ridge. Around 25 Ma B.P, the Pacific plate started to drift away from the Australian plate, thus splitting the volcanic ridge. The rifting was initially caused by extension until 6 Ma B.P, by which time seafloor spreading started in this region and eventually formed the Lau Basin between the separated ridges.

Spreading centers 

The V-shaped Lau Basin was opened by two southward propagating spreading centers: the Central Lau Spreading Center (CLSC) and the East Lau Spreading Center (ELSC). The initial ELSC was oriented north–south and has a spreading rate of ~100mm/yr. The northeastern tip of ELSC propagated southward faster than the other part and produced a pseudofault oriented 170 degree. The ELSC rotated 15–25 degree clockwise and continued to propagate towards the south. Then the CLSC, as well as an extensional transform zone (ETZ) linking  the two spreading centers were formed. The CLSC propagated southwards and replaced the northern segment ELSC. The region of overlap of CLSC and ELSC is characterized by strike-slip earthquakes. Recent measurements have shown that the opening rates are increasing at ELSC and CLSC. At present, the spreading rate of Lau Basin is about 150mm/year. It is an example of a fast-spreading back-arc basin.

Petrology 
Lau Basin volcanics are mainly andesites and dacites that were erupted 6.4 to 9.0 Ma. Most mafic rocks found are 55% SiO2 basaltic andesites. The whole basin floor is mostly composed of MORB-like rocks, but the westmost 80~120 km of the basin floor contains a mixture of MORB, transitional and arc-like basalts. This western region has a different composition because it was formed by extension and rifting between the Lau and Tonga ridges before seafloor spreading started. The grabens in this region was then filled by fresh magma from a mantle source that is different from the mantle source for CLSC/ELSC.

Mantle source 
The source of mantle melt to the Lau Basin is centered west of the spreading centers at shallow depth. This source may have directly supplied the western part of Lau Basin. The MORB-type basalt filled the grabens that were originally formed by extension in western Lau Basin. Asymmetric melt supply gave rise to the asymmetric thickness of crust at different sections of the basin. This melt supply may still be continuing today as indicated by a low-velocity anomaly in the upper mantle beneath the western Lau Basin.

Mantle convection 
At the subduction boundary between Pacific plate and Tonga-Kermadec plate, the roll-back of the Tonga trench and Pacific slab caused compensating flow of the mantle beneath the Lau Basin. This fertile mantle then encounters the water released from the dehydrated subducting Pacific slab and undergoes partial melting. This results in the creation of a batch of depleted mantle between the fertile mantle and subducting slab. An upward flow of the depleted layer is then induced by back-arc spreading and slab subduction towards corner region where the mantle is hydrated. The enhanced melting in this region prevents the depleted mantle from getting re-enriched and thus allows it to flow until it overturns. It is then carried back down beneath the back-arc as subduction continues. The ELSC located right on top of the highly depleted mantle thus experiences a diminished magma supply which results in a thinner layer of crust and a faster spreading rate. The CLSC, on the other hand, has thicker crust because it overlies the fertile mantle that is largely removed from effect of the volcanic front. Unlike ELSC, CLSC has characteristics that are much more similar to a mid-ocean ridge.

Crustal structure 
Crustal thickness increases from 6 km in the east to 9 km in the west. All of the Lau basin crust has a thicker midcrustal section than is seen in the pacific plate. The Lau Basin crust can be divided into eastern, central and western sections according to their thickness (5.5–6.5, 7.5–8.5 and 9 km, respectively). crust in the eastern section is similar to the one in the Pacific Plate with a thicker midcrustal layer and a thinner lower crustal layer. This suggests that it is composed of oceanic crust that was created more than 1.5Ma at the ELSC. The boundary between the eastern and central sections coincides with the boundary between the ELSC crust and CLSC crust, implying the internal structures in these two spreading ridges are, or were different. The central section has relatively thicker crust that formed within the past 1.5Ma at the CLSC. The boundary between the central and western crustal sections lies in the middle of ELSC crust, suggesting that the western section contains crust created both by oceanic spreading at ELSC and by island arc extension from the original Lau Basin.

Volcanoes and earthquakes 
At present, the Lau Basin is still an active back-arc that is rapidly evolving in time. Six of the seven volcanoes in the Lau Basin are still active. 
Earthquakes in this region are mostly crustal earthquakes. Small earthquakes from the basin are barely recorded on land because of high mantle attenuation. Most of the earthquakes, as well as volcanic activities locate at the east boundary of Lau Basin, along the Tonga Ridge which is very volcanically active.

References

Oceanic basins of the Pacific Ocean
Landforms of Oceania
Back-arc basins